Pertti Olavi "Spede" Pasanen (10 April 1930 – 7 September 2001) was a Finnish film director and producer, comedian, and inventor. During his career he directed, wrote, produced or acted in about 50 movies and participated in numerous TV productions, including the comedy Spede Show and the game-show Speden Spelit. Much of his more commercial work was in collaboration with Vesa-Matti Loiri (whose most popular character created by Pasanen was Uuno Turhapuro; first in TV sketches and then in a long-lasting series of motion pictures) and Simo Salminen. Pasanen's films and TV shows, often made quickly and on a low budget, usually received little critical recognition but were popular among Finnish audiences from the 1960s onwards. He was the owner of his own film production company, Filmituotanto Spede Pasanen Ky.

Childhood and youth
Pertti Olavi Pasanen was born in April 1930 in Kuopio. He was the eldest child of Kusti and Helmi Pasanen (née Rantala). His father was a forestry technician and worked as the district chief of the paper company Ahlström. Other children in the family included Pertti's little sister Virpi and little brother Risto. Pasanen's family lived in the Linnanpelto district. By Kuopio standards, the family was of upper middle class. The nickname "Spede" comes from an earlier nickname "Speedy" which he got from playing ice hockey, and was given to him at an early age. The nickname "Speedy" came from the fictional mouse character Speedy Gonzales, the hero of Warner Brothers' Looney Tunes and Merrie Melodies.

Pasanen's interests at school age included entertainment, sports, various games and inventions. He was the star of the Kuopio Lyceum's evening programs, played ice hockey with passion and performed chemical experiments in his home's basement. However, he did badly at school. In spring 1948 he got a report card with five 4 grades (failing grade in the Finnish school system) and stayed behind in his class after spending most of the spring by building a custom scooter from parts he had found from junk shops. After Pertti Pasanen had ended up in arguments with most of his teachers, his parents sent him to another school. In autumn 1950 Spede Pasanen moved to the Iisalmi lyceum, from where he matriculated in the Olympic spring of 1952. He spent the next year doing his military service and completed it with the rank of Sub-lieutenant in the anti-aircraft branch. In the military he also performed in the entertainment parade of the defence forces, which circulated between barracks entertaining soldiers.

In autumn 1953 Pasanen moved to Helsinki and started his studies at the Faculty of State Politics at the University of Helsinki. Instead of studying, he concentrated on social life at the Nation of Savonia, where he usually acted as host and master of ceremonies at parties. Pasanen's student indoctrinations and initiations of new students gained fame throughout the university. In the university he also met Jukka Virtanen and Matti Kuusla who became important partners for him. Kuusla, working at Fennada-Filmi as a studio assistant got him a background role in the 1954 film Laivan kannella. He appeared in the film as a man at a bar.

Radio career

During the late 1950s and early 1960s Spede was a noted presence as a radio comedian. He applied to work at Yleisradio twice in 1956 and again in 1959 as an entertainment provider (ajanvietetoimittaja) and was hired on his second try. Spede's most popular program was Ruljanssiriihi which combined sketch-comedy and musical performances. The program eventually developed into the program Hupiklubi. Spede and actor Leo Jokela also created the break-out character G. Pula-Aho (voiced by Jokela), a smart-talking, Helsinki slang using parrot who would insult Spede on Ruljanssiriihi.

Spede's other programs included Tervahöyry Hyrskynmyrskyn suvisilla laineilla, Hyvää iltaa – tulkaa mukaan and Kesäterässä.

Film career

After playing several supporting roles throughout the 1950s Spede made his first starring appearance in 1964's X-Paroni which he wrote and co-directed with his on-screen co-star Jaakko Pakkasvirta. The movie's success led to the creation of Milli Pilleri which also introduced moviegoers to Simo Salminen who became a fixture of Spede's acting troupe, often playing the side-kick to Spede's own characters. It was also the first movie Spede co-directed with Jukka Virtanen and Ere Kokkonen who would alternate directing Spede's future motion pictures, while Spede focused more on writing and producing.

1967's period-comedy Noin Seitsemän Veljestä was a parody of Robin Hood which Spede had worked on since the 1950s and introduced Vesa-Matti Loiri as an adult actor (having made his on-screen debut years earlier as a child actor in Pojat). The success of these movies led to Spede producing and releasing three movies in 1969, Näköradiomiehen ihmeelliset siekailut, Leikkikalugangsteri as well as his first colour feature Pohjan Tähteet. Näköradiomies performed well despite being a more serious movie but it and Pohjan Tähteet underperformed in comparison to the more typically comical Leikkikalugangsteri. Despite Pohjantähteet winning a shared Jussi Award for Kari Sohlberg in the category of best cinematography (with Spede's own Leikkikalugangsteri and Jörn Donner's Sixtynine 69), Pasanen did not produce another colour feature until the late 1970s.

Spede continued to experience success with Speedy Gonzales – noin 7 veljeksen poika and the tragic comedy Jussi Pussi both released in 1970. Speedy Gonzales performed well, despite Vesa-Matti Loiri being absent due to a leg injury just prior to shooting (he instead received a writing credit). Spede had to finance most of his films during this period due to his poor relations with the Finnish Film Foundation.

In 1971, Spede released three motion-pictures, Kahdeksas Veljes (his debut as a solo director) and Hirttämättömät (the sequel to Speedy Gonzales) both starring himself as well as Saatanan Radikaalit, which was co-directed by its four starring actors Paavo Piironen, Heikki Nousiainen, Timo Nissi and Heikki Huopainen. Spede only produced this movie which was intended to give its four stars a chance to complete a motion-picture on their own. All three movies under-performed though which led to Spede taking a two-year hiatus from film-making during which he focused exclusively on his TV work. Regardless, Spede won the 1971 Producers' Jussi Award for all three movies.

In 1973, Spede released the first Uuno Turhapuro movie based on the popular skit-character by the same name. To save costs, Spede filmed and edited the movie entirely on video and had it transferred to film for theatrical distribution. Uuno became a hit and a further four Uuno films were finished during the 1970s. Spede resumed filming small budget comedies with 1974's Viu-Hah-Hah-Taja, directed by Ere Kokkonen and mostly starring Spede's TV actors. Spede only appeared in a cameo and went uncredited as the film's writer. In 1979, he released Koeputkiaikuinen ja Simon enkelit, his first colour feature since Pohjantähteet. The movie was a surprise hit and led to a sequel Tup Akka Lakko being released the following year.

In the 1980s, the Uuno series peaked in popularity with 1984's Uuno Turhapuro armeijan leivissä breaking the record of the most popular Finnish domestic film. Spede cranked out movies on an annual basis, using his stock actors and frequently utilizing the popular skit characters for movies such as Kliffaa Hei, Pikkupojat, Fakta Homma and Onks Viljoo Näkyny. The last of these skit-comedy films is considered to be 1990s Rampe & Naukkis - Kaikkien aikojen superpari, which was lampooned on the popular characters created by Pirkka-Pekka Petelius and Aake Kalliala for the TV show Pulttibois.

During the 1990s, Spede focused almost exclusively on producing rather than writing or directing films with TV work taking more and more of his time. By this point his relationship with the Finnish Film Foundation had improved and he received grants for most of his films. The final movie directed by Pasanen was Naisen Logiikka, released in 1999 though production of it began in 1992. The film was hastily completed for release to prevent Pasanen from having to pay back his grant for the movie.

TV career

Starting from 1964, Spede began making live 15-minute sketch programming for Yleisradio. The show which alternated between the titles Spedevisio, Speden Saluuna as well as Spede Show established many of the tropes and core actors whom Spede would use in his films. Most of the early skit work is now lost due to live broadcasts not being routinely recorded. Spede appeared on TV continuously until 1976 when he started to focus primarily on film work.

Starting from 1981, Spede once again put priority on TV work. First airing surviving black and white skits on the recently established independent Mainos-TV channel, Spede, Simo Salminen and Vesa-Matti Loiri began producing new skits. Hannele Lauri also joined as a regular cast-member. The new Spede Show continued to air until 1987 when Spede and Loiri had a mock-feud which led to the launch of Vesa-Matti Loiri's own TV sketch show, Vesku Show. Throughout the 1980s, Spede also produced other programs such as the comedy program Fakta Homma and the competition show Kymppitonni with host Riitta Väisänen.

By the 1990s, Spede was himself tired of sketch-work but produced Aake Kalliala's and Pirkka-Pekka Petelius's Pulttibois and Tsa Tsa Tsaa as well as the sporty competition show Speden Spelit. Pasanen also produced more drama-programming such as Hynttyyt Yhteen, Blondi tuli taloon (The Blonde That Came to the House), and Ihmeiden tekijät (as well as its follow-up, Parhaat Vuodet). Many of these shows became stables of MTV3 with many of them airing for several seasons. Spede also approved the production of the dramedy-series Kuumia Aaltoja, which aired in 2003 (two years after his death).

Influences and comedy
Spede Pasanen named Bob Hope as one of his biggest comedy influences.

Spede Pasanen is considered emblematic of Savonian ironic humor varying between the fullest extremes of understatement and hyperbole. As he himself explained: "A Savonian never tells a thing exactly like it is." Spede's comedy denounced elitism and he explicitly sought to write and perform comedy for the largest possible audience. His early films in particular, featured elements uncommon to Finnish cinema such as fist-fights, car chases, other elaborate stunt-work as well as unconventional special effects. Many of his movies also featured unconventional settings (such as the medieval period or the wild west), though his later films focused almost entirely on poking fun at Finnish stereotypes.

His Uuno Turhapuro movies can be considered conventional farces. An unemployed slacker will, with comically incredible luck, a father-in-law who is rich and connected but unlucky (mainly due to Uuno), and with slick charm, end up in roles of minister, general officer, or rich man, usually causing havoc in the father-in-law's businesses.

Other achievements
Pasanen was also an inventor and jack-of-all-trades; he had over 50 patents registered to his name, and many of his films include Rube Goldberg-style gadgets. Besides gadgets involved with industrial production, his inventions include:

The Ski jumping sling
A Boat ski (to alleviate *bumps* in aquaplaning boat)
A self-extinguishing, one-size-fits-all candlestick.

For a period of time Pasanen was also obsessed with inventing a perpetual motion device. His crude drawings of it also appeared in his sketches shows and films. Once he became convinced that perpetual motion is theoretically impossible, he openly ridiculed himself in the character of Härski Hartikainen in one of the Uuno Turhapuro movies.

Personal life
Spede married Pirjo Vainimäki, the leading lady of his first starring picture X-Paroni, in 1965. Spede's first and only child, Pirre Pasanen, was born later that year. The couple separated in the early 1980s and divorced later.

A family private individual, Pasanen did not discuss his personal relationships in public. He had a long relationship with the 1976 Miss Europe, Riitta Väisänen. Pasanen valued loyalty and friendship, and even after separation, kept employing and financially supporting previous companions. During and after relationships, he vouchsafed confidentiality and privacy for all involved in his private life. His good relations with the media might have helped with this.

Death

On 7 September 2001 Pasanen was playing a round of golf at the Sarfvik golf course in Kirkkonummi, Finland. At the 9th hole he began to feel ill and was taken to the club house, where his condition rapidly deteriorated. Despite resuscitation by a doctor and a rapid response of emergency medical services Pasanen died. His death was attributed to advanced coronary artery disease.

Notable collaborators

 Ere Kokkonen
 Jukka Virtanen
 Simo Salminen
 Vesa-Matti Loiri
 Leo Jokela
 Riitta Väisänen 
 Pentti Siimes
 Olavi Ahonen
 Juhani Kumpulainen
 Hannele Lauri
 Marita Nordberg

Filmography

Writer, director or producer 

 X-Paroni (directed with Jaakko Pakkasvirta, 1964), in English The X-baron
 Millipilleri (1966)
 Pähkähullu Suomi (1967), in English The nutty Finland
 Noin seitsemän veljestä (1968), in English About seven Brothers
 Näköradiomiehen ihmeelliset siekailut (1969)
 Leikkikalugangsteri (1969), in English The Toy Gangster
 Pohjan tähteet (1969)
 Jussi Pussi (1970)
 Speedy Gonzales – noin 7 veljeksen poika (1970)
 Saatanan radikaalit (1971) (Producer only)
 Kahdeksas veljes (1971), in English The Eighth Brother
 Hirttämättömät (1971)
 Uuno Turhapuro (1973)
 Viu-hah hah-taja (1974)
 Professori Uuno D.G. Turhapuro (1975), in English Professor Uuno D.G. Turhapuro
 Lottovoittaja UKK Turhapuro (1976)
 Häpy Endkö? Eli kuinka Uuno Turhapuro sai niin kauniin ja rikkaan vaimon (1977)
 Rautakauppias Uuno Turhapuro, presidentin vävy (1978)
 Koeputkiaikuinen ja Simon enkelit (1979)
 Tup-akka-lakko (1980)
 Uuno Turhapuron aviokriisi (1981)
 Pölhölä (1981)
 Uuno Turhapuro menettää muistinsa (1982), in English Uuno Turhapuro loses his memory
 Uuno Turhapuron muisti palailee pätkittäin (1983)
 Lentävät luupäät (1984), in English The Flying Boneheads
 Uuno Turhapuro armeijan leivissä (1984)
 Uuno Epsanjassa (1985), in English Uuno in Spain
 Kliffaa hei! (1985)
 Uuno Turhapuro muuttaa maalle (1986)
 Liian iso keikka (1986), in English A Gig Too Big
 Pikkupojat (1986)
 Uuno Turhapuro – kaksoisagentti (1987)
 Fakta homma! (1987)
 Tupla-Uuno (1988), in English Double Uuno
 Onks' Viljoo näkyny? (1988), in English Have Ya Seen Viljo?
 Rampe & Naukkis (1990)
 Uunon huikeat poikamiesvuodet maaseudulla (1990)
 Uuno Turhapuro, herra Helsingin herra (1991)
 Uuno Turhapuro, Suomen tasavallan herra presidentti (1992)
 Uuno Turhapuron poika (1993), in English The Son of Uuno Turhapuro
 Romanovin kivet (1993)
 Pekko ja Poika (1994)
 Uuno Turhapuron veli (1994)
 Johtaja Uuno Turhapuro – pisnismies (1998)
 Naisen logiikka (1999), in English The Logic of the Women

Actor 

 Laivan kannella (1954)
 Sankarialokas (1955)
 Säkkijärven polkka (1955)
 Villi Pohjola (1955)
 Tyttö tuli taloon (1956)
 Tyttö lähtee kasarmiin (1956)
 Rintamalotta (1956)
 Anu ja Mikko (1956)
 Pekka ja Pätkä ketjukolarissa (1957)
 Vääpelin kauhu (1957)
 Pekka ja Pätkä sammakkomiehinä (1957)
 Asessorin naishuolet (1957)
 Pekka ja Pätkä Suezilla (1958)
 Ei ruumiita makuuhuoneeseen (1959)
 Mullin mallin (1961)
 Taape tähtenä (1962)
 Hopeaa rajan takaa (1963)
 Pohjan tähteet (1969)
 Tup-akka-lakko (1980)
 Koeputkiaikuinen ja Simon enkelit (1981)
 (Hei kliffaa hei! (1985)
 Pikkupojat (1986)
 Naisen logiikka (1999)

In the Uuno Turhapuro series, Pasanen played the role of Härski-Hartikainen, a car repairman with a cunning and ribald character, who often participated in Uuno's farcical adventures. His sidekick was Sörsselssön – earlier known as Lörssön (played by Simo Salminen).

Television series 
Spede is considered the father of modern Finnish television sketch-humour. Starting his career on Yleisradio he later jumped camps to the competing MTV3 network. However, his work on both has been extremely popular. Apart from starring in these series he was also the main producer for many of the popular shows on MTV3, such as the game-show Kymppitonni and the cult-hit show Pulttibois.

Yle
 Spede Show (1964, 1971–1976, 1982 ja 1984-1987)
 Speden saluuna (1965)
 Spedevisio (1965–1967)
 50 pientä minuuttia (1967–1971)
 Robin Hood ja hänen iloiset vekkulinsa Sherwoodin pusikoissa (1974)

MTV3

 Kymppitonni (1985–2005)
 Uuno Turhapuro armeijan leivissä (1986) (the film as a TV series)
 Vesku Show (1988–1991)
 Spede Special (1988–1990)
 Pulttibois (1989–1991)
 Spedestroikka (1990)
 Junnutonni (1991)
 Speden sallitut leikit (1990–1992)
 Speden tee-se-itse TV (1991–1992)
 Hynttyyt yhteen (1991–1995)
 Speden spelit (1992–2002)
 Tsa Tsa Tsaa (1993–1994)
 Blondi tuli taloon (1994–1995), in English The Blonde That Came to the House
 Uuno Turhapuro (TV series) (1996)
 Ihmeidentekijät (1996–1998)
 Parhaat vuodet (2000–2002)
 Kuumia aaltoja (2003)

Named after Spede Pasanen 
 SPEDE (Spacecraft Potential, Electron and Dust Experiment), an instrument attached to the SMART-1 lunar probe.

References

External links 
 
 

 
1930 births
2001 deaths
People from Kuopio
Finnish film producers
Finnish film directors
Finnish writers
Finnish male actors
Finnish inventors
Finnish male comedians
20th-century comedians